Ruth Roberta de Souza (3 October 1968 – 13 April 2021) was a Brazilian basketball player. She competed in the women's tournament at the 1992 Summer Olympics. Souza died in Três Lagoas on 13 April 2021, at the age of 52, due to COVID-19, after she had been hospitalized in the intensive care unit for two weeks.

References

External links
 

1968 births
2021 deaths
Brazilian women's basketball players
Basketball players at the 1992 Summer Olympics
Olympic basketball players of Brazil
People from Três Lagoas
Deaths from the COVID-19 pandemic in Mato Grosso do Sul
Sportspeople from Mato Grosso do Sul